Than Singh Jatav was an Indian politician and former civil servant.

Personal life 
Than Singh Jatav born in 1933 to Phaguni  Singh into Scheduled Caste family at Hathras, Aligarh district, British India. He completed his graduation from Dr. Bhimrao Ambedkar University at Uttar Pradesh.

In 1961 he got selected into Rajasthan Administrative Service. After serving as a non-gazetted official and AG, Rajasthan was promoted as BDO, SDM, Additional Collector, and Distt. Magistrate; Addl. Commissioner of Transport, Departmental Enquiries and Secretary of Rajasthan Housing Board, Settlement Officer and Secretary of Sports Council, etc. and took voluntary retirement in 1989.

Political career 

In 1989 he became Member of Parliament in Lok Sabha from the Bayana constituency.

He also served in Parliamentary Committees -

 Member of Zonal Railway User's Consultative Committee on Western Railways
 Committee on the Hindi Language in Ministry of Defence
 Committee on Emigration in Ministry of Labour
 Committee on Science and Technology
 Consultative Committee in Ministry of Water Resources.

He was also the Honourable General Secretary of Dr. Ambedkar Memorial Welfare Society, President of the Dalit Sahitya Academy, All India Federation of SC/ST, Backwards and Minorities Employees Welfare Association, and associated with Ambedkar Vichar Manch of Rajasthan.

References 

1933 births
Bharatiya Janata Party politicians from Rajasthan
Living people